Year 1571 (MDLXXI) was a common year starting on Monday (link will display the full calendar) of the Julian calendar.

Events 
<onlyinclude>

January–June 
 January 11 – The Austrian nobility are granted freedom of religion.
 January 23 – The Royal Exchange opens in London, England.
 c. February 4–9 – The Spanish Jesuit missionaries of the Ajacán Mission, established on the Virginia Peninsula of North America in 1570, are massacred by local Native Americans.
 March 18 – The Order of the Knights of Saint John transfers the capital of Malta, from Birgu to Valletta.
 May 24 – Moscow is burnt by the Crimean army, under Devlet I Giray.
 June 3 – Following the Battle of Bangkusay Channel, the conquest of the Kingdom of Maynila is complete; Spanish Conquistador Miguel López de Legazpi makes Manila a city, and the capital of the Philippines.
 June 25 – Queen Elizabeth's Grammar School, Horncastle, is founded in Lincolnshire, England.
 June 27 – Jesus College is established "within the City and University of Oxford of Queen Elizabeth's foundation" in England, by Welsh cleric and lawyer Hugh Price.

July–December 
 July 25 – St Olave's Grammar School is founded in Tooley Street, London.
 August 1 – The Ottoman conquest of Cyprus is concluded, by the surrender of Famagusta. Cyprus is established as an eyalet of the Ottoman Empire, and the first Turkish colony moves into the island.
 August 29 – Liliw, Laguna, Philippines is founded by Gat Tayaw, followers and residents as a municipality of Laguna.
 September 28 – The House of Commons of England introduces the first pro forma bill, symbolizing its authority over its own affairs.
 October 7 – Battle of Lepanto: Spanish, Venetian, and Papal naval forces, under Don John of Austria, defeat the Ottoman fleet of Müezzinzade Ali Pasha.

Date unknown 
 Using mercury in the silver extraction process dramatically increases the output of the Potosí mine; thus begins the great silver flow that links the New and Old Worlds.
 The Swedish Church Ordinance 1571 creates the first complete order of the Protestant Swedish church. The church ordinance also includes a chapter about schooling, in which all children in the cities, regardless of sex, are to be given elementary schooling.
 Taipalsaari is founded.

Births 

 January 9 – Charles Bonaventure de Longueval, Count of Bucquoy, French soldier in Habsburg service (d. 1621)
 January 27 – Abbas I of Safavid, Shah of Iran (d. 1629)
 February 15 – Michael Praetorius, German composer and writer on music (d. 1621)
 March 31 – Pietro Aldobrandini, Italian cardinal, archbishop (d. 1621)
 April 17 – Adam Contzen, German economist (d. 1635)
 April 22 – Giovanni Branca, Italian architect and engineer (d. 1645)
 April 24 – Sur Singh, Ruler of Marwar (d. 1619)
 May 11 – Niwa Nagashige, Japanese warlord (d. 1637)
 June 17 – Thomas Mun, English writer on economics (d. 1641)
 July 16 – Theodoor Galle, Flemish engraver (d. 1633)
 August 2 – Charles, Duke of Guise, son of Henry I (d. 1640)
 September 12 – Álvaro de Bazán, 2nd Marquis of Santa Cruz (d. 1646)
 September 21 – Giovanni Battista Magnani, Italian architect (d. 1653)
 September 29 – Caravaggio, Venetian artist (d. 1610)
 October 7
 Anton Henry, Count of Schwarzburg-Sondershausen from 1586 (d. 1638)
 Maria, Abbess of Quedlinburg, German abbess (d. 1610)
 October 15 – Jacob Matham, Dutch artist (d. 1631)
 October 18 – Wolfgang Ratke, German educational reformer (d. 1635)
 November 18 – Hippolytus Guarinonius, Italian physician and polymath (d. 1654)
 December 3 - Lakshmi Kumara Thathachariar, Indian saint (d. 1643)
 December 4 – Ferdinand, Prince of Asturias, Spanish prince (d. 1578)
 December 9 – Metius, Dutch mathematician and astronomer (d. 1635)
 December 20
 Giles de Coninck, Flemish Jesuit theologian (d. 1633)
 Scévole de Sainte-Marthe, French historian (d. 1650)
 December 27 – Johannes Kepler, German astronomer (d. 1630)
 December 31 – Emperor Go-Yōzei of Japan (d. 1617)
 date unknown
 Henry Ainsworth, English Nonconformist clergyman and scholar (d. 1622)
 William Bedell, Anglican churchman (d. 1642)
 Willem Blaeu, Dutch cartographer (d. 1638)
 Charles Butler, English beekeeper and philologist (d. 1647) 
 Frederick de Houtman, Dutch explorer (d. 1627)
 Esther Inglis, French (?British-born) calligrapher (d. 1624)
 Lucrezia Marinella, Italian poet and author (d. 1653)
 Paulus Moreelse, Dutch painter (d. 1638)
 Hugh Roe O'Donnell, Irish chieftain and rebel (d. 1603)
 Aleksander Ostrogski, Polish nobleman (d. 1603)
 Alessandro Peretti di Montalto, Venetian cardinal (d. 1623)
 Thomas Storer, English poet (d. 1604)
 Thomas Wintour, English Gunpowder Plot conspirator (d. 1606)

Deaths 

 January 3 
 Joachim II Hector, Elector of Brandenburg (b. 1505)
 Yi Hwang, Korean Neo-Confucian scholar, (b.1502)
 January 9 – Nicolas Durand de Villegaignon, French naval officer (b. 1510)
 January 13 – John, Margrave of Brandenburg-Küstrin (b. 1513)
 January 19 – Paris Bordone, Venetian painter (b. 1495)
 February 12 – Nicholas Throckmorton, English diplomat and politician (b. 1515)
 February 13 – Benvenuto Cellini, Italian artist (b. 1500)
 March 6 – Tsukahara Bokuden, Japanese swordsman (b. 1489)
 March 14 – John Sigismund Zápolya, King of Hungary (b. 1540)
 March 21 
 Odet de Coligny, French cardinal and Protestant (b. 1517)
 Hans Asper, Swiss painter (b. 1499)
 April 6 – John Hamilton, Scottish prelate and politician (b. 1511)
 May 4 – Pierre Viret, Swiss theologian (b. 1511)
 May 29 – Joachim Mörlin, German Lutheran bishop (b. 1514)
 June 1 – John Story, English Catholic (martyred) (b. 1504)
 June 3 – Tarik Sulayman, Filipino chieftain
 June 7 – Francesco Corteccia, Italian composer (b. 1502)
 July 6 – Mōri Motonari, Japanese warlord (b. 1497)
 July 15 – Shimazu Takahisa, Japanese samurai and warlord (b. 1514)
 July 17 – Georg Fabricius, German poet (b. 1516)
 August 17 – Marco Antonio Bragadin, Venetian lawyer and military officer (b. 1523)
 September 4 – Matthew Stewart, 4th Earl of Lennox (b. 1516)
 September 23 – John Jewel, English Anglican bishop (b. 1522)
 October 7
 Dorothea of Saxe-Lauenburg, Danish queen, consort of Christian III of Denmark (b. 1511)
 Müezzinzade Ali Pasha, Ottoman statesmen and naval officer
 November 24 – Jan Blahoslav, Czech writer (b. 1523)
 December 14 – Lorenzo Strozzi, Italian Catholic cardinal (b. 1513)
 date unknown
 Titu Cusi, Incan ruler (b. 1529)
 Anna Vigfúsdóttir á Stóru-Borg, Icelandic landowner
 Setthathirath, Laotian king of Lan Na and Lan Xang (b. 1534)

References